I Got a Woman is an album by organist Jack McDuff recorded between 1964 and 1966 and released on the Prestige label.

Reception
Allmusic awarded the album 3 stars.

Track listing 
All compositions by Jack McDuff except as indicated
 "How High the Moon" (Nancy Hamilton, Morgan Lewis) - 5:40   
 "English Country Gardens" (Traditional) - 4:20   
 "Spoonin'" - 6:00   
 "I Got a Woman" (Ray Charles, Renald Richard) - 8:30   
 "Twelve Inches Wide" - 8:00

Personnel 
Jack McDuff - organ
Red Holloway (tracks 2-5), Harold Ousley (track 1) - tenor saxophone 
George Benson (tracks 2, 4 & 5), Pat Martino (tracks 1 & 3) - guitar
Joe Dukes - drums 
Montego Joe - congas (track 5)
Big band arranged and conducted by Benny Golson (track 2)

References 

Jack McDuff albums
1969 albums
Prestige Records albums
Albums arranged by Benny Golson